HMT Elk was a 181-ton former fishing trawler built in 1902. She served in the Royal Navy in World War II, until sunk without loss of life having hit a mine off Plymouth in November 1940.

Ship history
Elk was built by Cook, Welton & Gemmell at Beverley, Yorkshire, launched on 21 August 1902, and first operated from Grimsby. During World War I she was hired by the Admiralty and served as a minesweeper from 1914 until 1918. She was then operated commercially under various owners at Grimsby, Hakin and Plymouth. Elk was hired by the Admiralty in November 1939 to serve as a danlayer (laying buoys in channels cleared by minesweepers) and was armed with one 6-pounder gun. HMT Elk was sunk by a mine south-east of Penlee Point, Cornwall on 27 November 1940. There were no casualties.

See also

References

External links
 wrecksite.eu : Trawler Elk 1902-1940

1902 ships
Naval trawlers of the United Kingdom
World War II shipwrecks in the English Channel
Wreck diving sites in the United Kingdom
Maritime incidents in November 1940
Ships sunk by mines